José Abrahám Monterrosa Argumedo (born July 3, 1975, in  El Salvador) is a retired Salvadoran football player.

Club career
Nicknamed La Tortuga, he won several titles with C.D. Luis Ángel Firpo and won a silver medal with the El Salvador national team U21 at the Central American Games. Persisting injuries cut short his career. After retiring, he moved to work in the United States but returned to El Salvador but does not consider to take up a job in football again.

International career
Monterrosa made his debut for El Salvador in a November 1998 friendly match against Mexico and has played only one more international, against Honduras in the same month, scoring no goals.

References

External links
 

1975 births
Living people
People from La Libertad Department (El Salvador)
Association football midfielders
Salvadoran footballers
El Salvador international footballers
C.D. Luis Ángel Firpo footballers
C.D. Águila footballers
Atlético Balboa footballers
A.D. Isidro Metapán footballers